Kostandin Ndoni (born 31 March 1989 in Lushnja) is an Albanian footballer who plays as a centre back for Kukësi in the Albanian Superliga.

References

1989 births
Living people
Sportspeople from Lushnjë
Association football central defenders
Albanian footballers
KF Apolonia Fier players
Nea Salamis Famagusta FC players
Othellos Athienou F.C. players
KS Kastrioti players
FK Kukësi players
Kategoria Superiore players
Kategoria e Parë players
Cypriot Second Division players
Albanian expatriate footballers
Expatriate footballers in Cyprus
Albanian expatriate sportspeople in Cyprus
Expatriate footballers in Greece
Albanian expatriate sportspeople in Greece